Nathayyapalem is a neighborhood situated in the northern part of Visakhapatnam City, India. The area, which falls under the local administrative limits of Greater Visakhapatnam Municipal Corporation, is about 17 km from the Maddilapalem city centre. Nathayyapalem  is located between Sheela Nagar and Gajuwaka. It is well connected with Dwaraka Nagar, NAD X Road and Madhurawada.

Transport
APSRTC routes:

References

Neighbourhoods in Visakhapatnam